Chile sent competitors to the 2018 Winter Paralympics in Pyeongchang, South Korea. There were 4 people in para-alpine skiing. The skiers went to races to be allowed to go to South Korea.  Starting in November 2017, they went to 15 races in Europe, the United States and Canada to get ready. Santiago Vega went to the 2014 Winter Paralympics.  Nicolás Bisquert, Diego Seguel and Julio Soto were going to their first Paralympic Games.

Team 
Chile had 4 people at the 2018 Winter Paralympics.  In the past, Diego Seguel was part of Team Chile at competitions around the world in another sport: para-athletics. All four had 220 points by February 2018.  They needed to have 220 total points or more in the time between when the 2014 Winter Paralympics ended and February 2018.  Vega competed at the 2014 Winter Paralympics for Chile.  He was the only member of the team to do that.  The 2018 Games will be the first for Bisquert, Seguel and Soto.

The table below contains the list of members of people (called "Team Chile") that participated in the 2018 Games.

Results

Alpine skiing 
For the super combined event, the first run is the super-G and the second run is the slalom.

Men

References 

Nations at the 2018 Winter Paralympics
2018
2018 in Chilean sport